A popstar is a person who is famous for singing pop music.

Popstar or pop star may also refer to:

Film and TV
 Popstar (film), a 2005 direct-to-video film
 Popstar: Never Stop Never Stopping, a 2016 mockumentary comedy film

Television
 Popstar (TV series), a Brazilian daytime live celebrity singing competition
 Popstars, an international popular music reality series franchise
 Popstars (Brazilian TV series)
 Popstars (Dutch TV series)
 Popstars (French TV series)
 Popstars (German TV series)
 Popstars (Mexican TV series)
 Popstars (Portuguese TV series)
 Popstars (British TV series)
 Popstars: The Rivals, British series
 Popstars Live, Australian series

Music

Albums
 Popstar, an alternative name for Rouge (Rouge album)
 Popstar: A Dream Come True, a 2003 debut album of Filipino singer Sarah Geronimo
 Popstars (Hear'Say album), 2001
 Popstars (Lollipop album), 2001
 Popstars, a 2001 album by American girl group Eden's Crush
 Popstars, a 2002 album by French band Whatfor
 Popstar Nima, a 2019 self-titled album by Popstar Nima

Songs
"Pop Star", a 1970 song by British singer Cat Stevens
"Pop Star", a 1981 song by Toyah from the album Anthem
"Pop Star", a 2005 Japanese song by Ken Hirai
"Popstar" (DJ Khaled song), 2020
"Popstar" (Jon Nørgaard song), 2005
"Pop/Stars", a 2018 song by virtual K-pop girl group K/DA

Other uses
 Pop Star, the main planet where the Kirby series takes place
 Popstar!, a teen magazine